Bakainiai (formerly) is a village in Kėdainiai district municipality, in Kaunas County, in central Lithuania. According to the 2011 census, the village had a population of 62 people. It is located 1 km from Surviliškis, by the Liaudė river. There is hillfort in Bakainiai, on the bank of the Liaudė.

History
Bakainiai castle was mentioned in 1731, by Teutonic Order. At the 18th century there was a well fortified Swedish war camp on the hillfort.

Demography

Images

References

Villages in Kaunas County
Kėdainiai District Municipality